Big George Foreman: The Miraculous Story of the Once and Future Heavyweight Champion of the World (or simply Big George Foreman) is an upcoming American biographical sports drama film directed by George Tillman Jr. The film focuses on the life of world heavyweight boxing champion George Foreman, played by Khris Davis. It also stars Jasmine Mathews, John Magaro, Sullivan Jones, Lawrence Gilliard Jr., Sonja Sohn, and Forest Whitaker.

Cast
 Khris Davis as George Foreman
 Jasmine Mathews
 John Magaro
 Sullivan Jones as Muhammad Ali
 Lawrence Gilliard Jr. 
 Sonja Sohn
 Forest Whitaker as Doc Broadus
 Shein Mompremier

Production
A biographical film based on George Foreman's career was announced in 2021. It would be directed by George Tillman Jr. from a screenplay by Tillman and Frank Baldwin, which is adapted from a screen story written by Tillman, Baldwin, and Dan Gordon. Khris Davis was cast as Foreman, Forest Whitaker as Doc Broadus, and Sullivan Jones as Muhammad Ali. Michael K. Williams was originally cast as Doc Broadus (Foreman's trainer and mentor), but died before production began.

Filming
Under the working title Heart of a Lion, principal photography was set to begin in the autumn of 2021 in New Orleans, Louisiana, but was halted by the landfall of Hurricane Ida.  Production was set to resume filming in Shreveport by that November but was shut down until early 2022 for an unknown reason.  Filming took place from February to March 2022 in New Orleans.

Release
The film was originally scheduled to be released on September 16, 2022 but was pushed to March 24, 2023.  It was pushed back again and is set to be released on April 28, 2023, by Sony Pictures.

References

External links
 
 

2023 drama films
2020s American films
2020s biographical drama films
2020s English-language films
2020s sports drama films
Affirm Films films
African-American films
American biographical drama films
American boxing films
American sports drama films
Biographical films about sportspeople
Cultural depictions of Muhammad Ali
Films directed by George Tillman Jr.
Films scored by Marcelo Zarvos
Films shot in New Orleans
Mandalay Pictures films
Sony Pictures films
Upcoming English-language films